Do It Good is the debut album by the American funk and disco group KC and the Sunshine Band. Produced by Richard Finch, it was released in 1974 on the TK label.

History
Do It Good had little mainstream impact in the United States, despite catchy tracks like "Sound Your Funky Horn". The album was focused towards an upbeat funk, which would later turn into disco.

After the song "Queen of Clubs" became a hit, the album was re-issued in 1978 with the title Queen of Clubs. The record had a new cover that featured a playing card with the Queen of Clubs on the front (the disc label still gave the album title as Do It Good).

Record World said of "Queen of Clubs" that "the sound is fuller than on recent K.C. hits with an uptempo Motown feel."

The album was remastered and reissued with bonus tracks in 2012 by Big Break Records.

Track listing

Personnel
Harry Wayne Casey – keyboards, vocals
Richard Finch – bass guitar, drums, percussion
Jerome Smith – guitar
Oliver Brown – percussion
Fermin Goytisolo – percussion
Ken Faulk – trumpet
Vinnie Tanno – trumpet
Mike Lewis – tenor saxophone
Whit Sidener – baritone saxophone
Beverly Champion – background vocals
Margaret Reynolds – background vocals
Jeanette Williams – background vocals

Guest musicians
Jimmy "Bo" Horne – background vocals
George McCrae – background vocals
Gwen McCrae – background vocals
Betty Wright – background vocals

References

External links
 Do It Good at Discogs

1974 debut albums
KC and the Sunshine Band albums
TK Records albums